Octavia (minor planet designation: 598 Octavia) is a minor planet orbiting the Sun. At 15:45 UTC on October 6, 2014, the 13.5 magnitude asteroid occulted with magnitude 8.1 TYC 1299-00020-1, and was visible in Taiwan.

References

External links
 
 

Background asteroids
Octavia
C-type asteroids (Tholen)
X-type asteroids (SMASS)
19060413
Octavia the Younger